G-protein-coupled receptor kinase 3 (GRK3) is an enzyme that in humans is encoded by the ADRBK2 gene. GRK3 was initially called Beta-adrenergic receptor kinase 2 (βARK-2), and is a member of the G protein-coupled receptor kinase subfamily of the Ser/Thr protein kinases that is most highly similar to GRK2.

Function 

G protein-coupled receptor kinases phosphorylate activated G protein-coupled receptors, which promotes the binding of an arrestin protein to the receptor. Arrestin binding to phosphorylated, active receptor prevents receptor stimulation of heterotrimeric G protein transducer proteins, blocking their cellular signaling and resulting in receptor desensitization. Arrestin binding also directs receptors to specific cellular internalization pathways, removing the receptors from the cell surface and also preventing additional activation. Arrestin binding to phosphorylated, active receptor also enables receptor signaling through arrestin partner proteins. Thus the GRK/arrestin system serves as a complex signaling switch for G protein-coupled receptors.

GRK3 and the closely related GRK2 phosphorylate receptors at sites that encourage arrestin-mediated receptor desensitization, internalization and trafficking rather than arrestin-mediated signaling (in contrast to GRK5 and GRK6, which have the opposite effect). This difference is one basis for pharmacological biased agonism (also called functional selectivity), where a drug binding to a receptor may bias that receptor’s signaling toward a particular subset of the actions stimulated by that receptor.

GRK3 is expressed broadly in tissues, but generally at lower levels than the related GRK2. GRK3 has particularly high expression in olfactory neurons, and mice lacking the ADRBK2 gene exhibit defects in olfaction. Gene linkage techniques were used to identify a polymorphism in the promoter of the human ADRBK2 gene as a possible cause of up to 10% of cases of bipolar disorder. However, the significance of GRK3 in bipolar disorder has been controversial due to conflicting reports. GRK3 has also been implicated in regulation of dopamine receptors in Parkinson disease in animal models. Reduced expression of GRK3 has been associated with the immunodeficient WHIM syndrome in humans, and appears causative in a mouse model of the disease.

References

Further reading

External links 
 Online version of the paper in Molecular Psychiatry
 PubMed abstract
 Report from sciencedaily.com
 

Biology of bipolar disorder
EC 2.7.11